Ali Al-Hosani (Arabic:علي الحوسني) (born 26 May 1988) is an Emirati footballer. He currently plays as a goalkeeper for Ajman Club .

External links

References

Emirati footballers
1988 births
Living people
Al Wahda FC players
Ajman Club players
Place of birth missing (living people)
UAE Pro League players
Association football goalkeepers